Violet Meme -Murasaki no Jyouhoudentatsu Chi-(Violet Meme －紫の情報伝達値－), also known as Quantum Mechanics Rainbow I: Violet Meme, is the sixth (fifth of entirely new music) solo album by artist Daisuke Asakura. It is the first in a series of seven albums released by Asakura in 2004, called Quantum Mechanics Rainbow. Each album revolves around a different color of the rainbow and a different term relating to Quantum Mechanics. This album revolves around the color violet.

Track listing

All songs produced, composed and arranged by Daisuke Asakura

References
 Official Daisuke Asakura Profile
 Daisuke Asakura Discography on Sony Music Japan

2004 albums
Daisuke Asakura albums